Bird Islands are 2 small islands in the Northern part of Shelburne Bay in far north Queensland, Australia about 30 km north of Cape Grenville, Cape York Peninsula in the Great Barrier Reef Marine Park Queensland, Australia. It is around 21 hectares or 0.21 square km in size.

References 

Islands on the Great Barrier Reef
Uninhabited islands of Australia
Islands of Far North Queensland
Protected areas of Far North Queensland